Take the Long Way Home may refer to:

Songs
 "Take the Long Way Home" (John Schneider song), a song by John Schneider
 "Take the Long Way Home" (Supertramp song), a song by Supertramp
 "Take the Long Way Home", a song from the album Sunday 8PM by Faithless

Other uses
 Take the Long Way Home—Live in Montreal, a musical DVD by Roger Hodgson

See also
 Long Way Home (disambiguation)